is a video game developed and published by Namco. It was released in Japan for the Family Computer on August 1, 1986, for the Virtual Console on March 20, 2007, for the Nintendo 3DS on September 4, 2013 and for the Wii U on February 4, 2015.

Gameplay

The player controls Valkyrie in her quest to defeat Zouna and restore peace to Marvel Land. With brown hair and no helmet, she begins the game armed with only a short sword. The player helps Valkyrie fight monsters, collect gold and find stronger equipment which will increase her powers; eventually, she finds a helmet and cloak. With the people of Marvel Land terrorized or controlled by Zouna, she receives no hints or advice. The player must devise a plan to defeat Zouna, with many of Valkyrie's tasks not immediately apparent; some can only be guessed by exploration and experimentation.

When Valkyrie defeats a monster, she earns experience points towards the next level and (usually) a small amount of money. Although money is scarce in Marvel Land, the player rarely needs it to buy equipment. All the game's items can be obtained for free if the player knows where to look. In addition to equipping weapons and armor, Valkyrie gains access to seven spells. When she learns each one depends on her intelligence, which increases with each level of experience. The first, and possibly the most valuable, of these is the healing spell.

Plot
In Marvel Land, people coexist in peace and harmony with nature, and the animals are docile. Humans, Sandras, Quarkmen, Tattas and other races mingle, working to improve their community. A large clock tower, resembling a stone grandfather clock, stands watch over the countryside; an ancient evil was sealed in the clock long ago with a key of time (stored in the middle of its face), and the people have lost their fear.

One day, the clock tower mysteriously stops working.  Before long, a villager takes it upon themselves to rewind the clock. Fumbling with the key of time, the villager drops it, and before they can pick it up, Zouna, a dark wizard who manipulates time, escapes and takes the key.

Zouna wreaks havoc in Marvel Land, darkening and terrorizing its people and laying waste to the countryside. Confident in his power, he builds a castle, ruins once-thriving towns and villages, and separates families. Only a few scattered towns remained standing, a futile bastion against Zouna's invasion. Even Krino Sandra (known as Whirlo in Europe) would be subdued heroically by Zouna; Marvel Land needs a savior.

Valkyrie, a fledgling shieldmaiden descends to Marvel Land from the heavens. In her first adventure, she wields a simple shield and a mace of light. Vowing to save Marvel Land from the darkness which has consumed it, her adventure begins.

Development

Being one of the first third-party companies for the console, Japanese company Namco was seeing great success with their releases on Nintendo's highly-popular Family Computer. Their arcade game ports such as Pac-Man and Xevious were unprecedented successes, and generated a lot of revenue for the company. Seeing the Famicom as the next evolution in video games, Namco began to develop exclusive titles for the console instead of simply ports or remakes of their earlier arcade games. The first of these was Star Luster in 1985, a well-received space combat simulation game. With games like The Legend of Zelda being hugely popular for the console, Namco decided their next game would be a similar role-playing game, with a large, vast world and unique characters.

Valkyrie no Bōken was the result of this. The game's characters and world were designed by character designer Hiroshi Fujii. Joining Namco after graduating college, Fujii was initially assigned to the company's design department, working on the package artwork for games like Sky Kid, Tower of Babel, and Family Tennis. Once the division was dissolved, he was transferred to the game development department, becoming a character artist for Valkyrie no Bōken. Fujii's drawings were used heavily for reference by the development team, acting as a design document of sorts. Due to hardware limitations, his drawings could not be accurately replicated in the game itself; most notable of these is Valkyrie herself, being blond on the cover art and having black hair in-game. Fujii looked to Norse mythology while designing the characters and setting. Valkyrie was originally depicted as a "child of the gods" in early sketches, but was changed to being a simple female warrior due to her design being drastically different from the Valkyries in Norse mythology.

Release
Namco published Valkyrie no Bōken on August 1, 1986. It was published under Namcot, Namco's older home console game division from the mid-1980s and early 1990s. Included with the game was a detailed map that showed the first few areas of the game and hints on how to get some of the more valuable items. In 1998, Namco published Namco Anthology 2 for the PlayStation, which included ports and enhanced remakes of older Namcot games. Valkyrie no Bōken was included, alongside a remake that had a more arcade-like focus rather than the original's traditional role-playing format. Namco Anthology 2 was digitally re-released for the PlayStation Network in 2013 under the Game Archives label.

Two mobile phone versions of Valkyrie no Bōken were released in Japan. The first was in 2006 for the FOMA 900i line of phones, specifically through the i-Mode cellphone network. The second was released in 2007 by Namco Bandai Games for the S! Appli digital storefront. Both of these could be downloaded through the company's official game services through these networks for a monthly fee, and featured graphics in the vein of its arcade sequel Valkyrie no Densetsu. The Famicom original was published for the Wii Virtual Console in 2007 for Japan, and for the 3DS Virtual Console in 2013 and the Wii U Virtual Console in 2015.

Reception

Legacy
Valkyrie no Bōken was followed by Valkyrie no Densetsu, a 1989 arcade game with simultaneous two-player play and a console conversion released for the PC Engine. That year an MSX2 game, Valkyrie no Bōken II, was announced; although the game demo was included on DiskStation Compilation No. 4, its production was canceled.

In 1992 Namco released a prequel to Valkyrie no Bōken, Xandra no Daibōken: Valkyrie to no Deai, for the Super Famicom. Featuring Valkyrie's green amphibian-appearing friend, Krino Sandra (Whirlo), the prequel was released in Europe as Whirlo. Valkyrie no Bōken was resurrected for the PlayStation in 1998 on Namco Anthology 2, with an upgraded (linear) version of the game side-by-side with an emulation of the Famicom original.

Walküre no Densetsu Gaiden: Rosa no Bōken is a digital comic released by Namco for Windows on April 26, 1996. In it, the Great Goddess tasks Rosa with pursuing the monster Tōrushin on a floating island in the sky over Marvel Land. Its audio drama version was released earlier on March 25. In 2007, Namco released The Glory of Walküre, an upgrade of the original game with enhanced graphics, for Japanese cell phones using the i-Apli system.

Notes

References

1986 video games
Action-adventure games
Japan-exclusive video games
Mobile games
Namco games
Bandai Namco Entertainment franchises
Nintendo Entertainment System games
Video games based on Norse mythology
Video games developed in Japan
Video games featuring female protagonists
Virtual Console games
Virtual Console games for Wii U
Video games about valkyries
Single-player video games